The 2011–12 First League of the Republika Srpska is the seventeenth season of the First League of the Republika Srpska, the second tier football league of Bosnia and Herzegovina, since its original establishment and the tenth as a second-tier league. It began on 13 August 2011 and ended on 26 May 2012; a winter break where no matches will be played was in effect between 5 November 2011 and 10 March 2012. Kozara were the last champions, having won their first championship title in the 2010–11 season and earning a promotion to Premier League of Bosnia and Herzegovina. This year Radnik won the championship, the third time they won the First League of the Republika Srpska.

14 clubs are participating in this session, eleven returning from the previous session, one relegated from Premier League of Bosnia and Herzegovina and two promoted from two regional Second League of the Republika Srpska.

Changes from last season

Team changes

From First League of the RS

Promoted to Premier League
 Kozara

Relegated to one of 2 respective regional Second League of the RS
 Famos (Second League of the RS - East)
 BSK (Second League of the RS - West)

To First League of RS

Relegated from Premier League

 Drina (Z)

Promoted from two regional Second League of the RS
 Crvena Zemlja (Second League of the RS - West)
 Rudar (U) (Second League of the RS - East)

Stadia and locations

Personnel and kits

Note: Flags indicate national team as has been defined under FIFA eligibility rules. Players may hold more than one non-FIFA nationality.

Managerial changes

New relegation rules

Unlike the last season, this season the Football Federation of the Republika Srpska decided to add relegation play-offs. Along the two last placed clubs in the league table which get relegated, the twelfth ranked team has to play relegation play-offs against the winner of the Second League of the Republika Srpska promotion play-offs which is contested between the two runners-up of the two Second Leagues of the Republika Srpska.

League table

Relegation play-offs

Sloboda (NG) as 12th-placed team faced the winner of the promotion play-offs contested between the two runners-up of the two Second Leagues of the Republika Srpska, runner-up of the Second League of the RS - West side Jedinstvo in a two-legged play-off. Sloboda (NG) won 5–0 on aggregate and thus were not relegated from the First League of the Republika Srpska. Jedinstvo also remained in their respective league.

Positions by round

Results

Clubs season-progress

Season statistics

Top goalscorers

See also
2010–11 First League of the Republika Srpska
2011–12 Second League of the Republika Srpska
2011–12 First League of the Federation of Bosnia and Herzegovina
2011–12 Premier League of Bosnia and Herzegovina
2011–12 Kup Bosne i Hercegovine
Football Federation of Bosnia and Herzegovina

References

External links
Official site for the Football Federation of Bosnia and Herzegovina
Official site for the Football Federation of the Federation of Bosnia and Herzegovina
Official site for the Football Federation of the Republika of Srpska

 

Bos
2011–12 in Bosnia and Herzegovina football
First League of the Republika Srpska seasons